YVHS can refer to:

Ygnacio Valley High School located in Concord, California.
Yucca Valley High School located in Yucca Valley, California.